Luna Park, an amusement park in Scranton, Pennsylvania, from 1906 to 1916, initially designed, built, and operated by two companies affiliated with amusement park pioneer Frederick Ingersoll, occupied a mostly western-facing 20-acre tract of land on Moosic Mountain along the eastern side of Roaring Brook gorge, opposite present-day Nay Aug Park. No historical marker commemorates the site of the park.

Inception

Despite similar names, the park is not affiliated with Thompson & Dundy's park on Coney Island, New York, USA, or the "Hippodrome". Thompson & Dundy, however, first promoted ideas of franchising in August 1904 but did not file for trademark or copyright protection. Although many types of parks, exhibitions, and entertainment attractions existed at this time, Ingersoll capitalized on standardization, following a formula that characterizes all his "Luna Parks": the first two, in Pittsburgh and Cleveland opened in 1905, a park in Washington, DC and Indianapolis opened in the same year as Scranton, one in Mexico City the following year, then others, forming the first amusement park chain. Advertising in trade publications, such as The Billboard, Ingersoll sought regional investors with catch-phrases as "We use the best materials, perfect plans, expert builders, and reasonable price. We build for you or build and operate." Construction was standardized, and vaudevillian acts, circus, and other exhibitions were able to be rotated between parks as low-cost entertainment. Parks were designed and built using expertise of his Ingersoll Construction Company employees, then operated by a local company which could acquire services, such as entertainment and technical help, from him.

As such, Ingersoll Construction Company with funding of $300,000, designed and constructed the park beginning November 14, 1905. The Scranton Luna Park Company began operating the park on May 28, 1906. Newspaper articles from the Scranton Republican, The Scranton Truth, and other local newspapers suggest a decision to proceed was based on increasing levels of public interest beginning as early as July 17, 1900.

Between 1903 and 1905, besides related interest pieces, such as "The Execution of Topsy the Elephant", and "Moon Queen to Become Bride", among others, local newspapers published an ever-increasing number of advertisements regarding chartered excursions by the Central Railroad of New Jersey and the Lehigh Valley Railroad to Luna Park, Coney Island. This did not escape notice of local financiers, publicly known initially as Thomas F. Penman, John H. Brooks, C.K. Bedford, S.S. Spruks, Charles Gunster, Herman Osthaus, and Hayden Evans, suggesting the public's increasing interest was income that could otherwise be earned locally. Similarly, the investors noticed remarkably heavy patronage of "Carbondale's Luna Park", a temporary fund raising effort facilitated by multiple volunteer fire companies recreating a "miniature-Luna Park" in the borough for a short time. In this same period, perhaps submitted by Ingersoll himself, the Scranton Republican ran a lengthy article, "The Marvels of Luna Park - How a 39-acre Mud Hole Evolved into a Multi-million Dollar Entertainment Enterprise", showing a time and cost breakdown per patron per amusement. Reasonable estimates of anticipated income and profitability, and knowledge of available support services, provided the investors with the business justification to approve Ingersoll's announcement of "Luna Park, Scranton" in the fall of 1905 and proceed with construction.

Design and construction

Ingersoll's park planning relied on specific "anchor" amusements and taking advantage of scenic location. Ingersoll, himself, described this park as being "of three parts". The "first section" dammed Roaring Brook to form a small lake intended for boating and aquatic sports. Crossing a high footbridge over the gorge, one entered an oval-shape amusement "second section" centered around the "T. Folks Shoot-the-Chutes" pool known as "The Lagoon". Buildings and amusements would change over the life of the park, but initially this was composed of the "Scenic Railway", "H.G. Traver's Aerial Circle Swing", "Scenic River/Old Mill", "Blarney Castle", "Shades and Shadows", "E. Conley's Shooting Gallery", a "Steele MacKaye Scenitorium", "Temple of Mystery", "Edisonia", "Trip to Rockaway", "Dance Pavilion", "J.D. William's Restaurant", a 3-tier "Dentzel Menagerie Carousel", "Williams Ice Cream/Soda Fountain", "Band Stand", and "Circus Platform" (later called "The Hippodrome"). The third section was the picnic grounds with a large "Picnic Pavilion". Other significant attractions were added to the park over time, from the groundbreaking "Hale's Tours of the World" to the more simplistic "Mahoney's Pony Rides". Live vaudeville acts, exhibitions, circus, and orchestra performances were scheduled as free entertainment complementing patrons' visits. Two of the most successful were appearances of the Knabenshue Toledo No. 2 airship, flown by Aviator Lincoln Beachey, and the world-famous leopard act by Dolores Vallecita.

Integral to its design, Scranton Luna Park was to be serviced by rail facilities as a "trolley park". The park enjoyed record attendance in its first years, facilitated primarily by an interurban, electrified, Lackawanna & Wyoming Valley Railroad or "Laurel Line", and Scranton Railway Company trolleys. Not until several years later were two automobile parking lots added.

Financial concerns

The biggest disadvantage to park planning was that two large lots upon which they were sited were leased with ballooning rental payments over time. This proved consequential as effects of the Panic of 1907 wracked the U.S. economy. Ingersoll publicly spoke of expanding the park after the first year of operation but was forced to regroup funds. He sold his stock holdings in the park to the board of the Scranton Luna Park Company and resigned his position as the park's vice-president. As the recession took hold of the economy, outings, picnics, and excursions no longer were reserved by church groups, social organizations, and businesses as they had been. Undaunted and following Ingersoll's idea, the Board of Directors moved forward with major expansion, adding a number of buildings, demolishing and remodeling others, and adding major lighting effects to stimulate public interest. Consequently, these actions initiated debt as ticket sales did not cover operating expenses, lease payments, and added cost of expansion.

Rather than default on lease payments, the Board of Directors decided to accept new members, local capitalists that could not only pay off construction debt but acquire land outright. The principal investor was Adolph Blau who maintained a series of local businesses including a private bank, "The Blau Bank House", to which representatives of the park critically signed promissory notes consisting of a modest pay-back schedule and with a confession of judgement clause. Blau received a majority of stock for the transaction and became president of the park company for several years. Surprisingly, despite the failing economy and debt scare, the Board of Directors invested in additional attractions prior to opening for the 1909 season – an arcade, "Billiken's Temple" fun house, alligator zoo, glass blowing exhibit, miniature railroad, and upgrades to others not previously contemplated. During this season, competition from other area parks, largely copying the "Luna recipe", began to have an effect on drawing park patrons away.

Continuous, reliable revenue remained a problem. Attendance was highly variable and unable to be forecast with certainty. Throughout the next four years, management observed large crowds on weekends, holidays, and special occasions such as company picnics, and special outings but sparse during an average day.  They identified several serious problems for which a remedy was difficult, especially without Ingersoll's professional advice and expertise.

Attempts at mitigating strategies

One issue was obtaining quality vaudeville acts, despite membership in the National Amusement Park Association. A counter-strategy, erecting an outdoor 35 × 40 foot "moving picture" screen and displaying first-run films, many of which were untitled "dailies" from movie companies out of New York was not successful in bad weather.  Another idea tested, drawing inspiration from Barnum, was to establish a full-scale circus staged in a vacant field within park boundaries, curtailed as too expensive. Park management tested other ideas; one resulted in an air crash of a Curtis biplane by Aviator Lester Weeks in the park.

A scheme intending to bottle mineral water under the non-trademarked name "Yam-Yam" (Sea-to-Sea) from the park's "Tunnel Spring" located between the Scenic Railway station and the Photography Studio for retail sale, failed. Despite construction of the "Spring House", personal endorsements extolling the water's virtues as a Native American elixir, and renaming the spring to "The Nayawauga Mineral Spring", it unexpectedly encountered backlash from neighbors' vehement complaints of paying for water formerly accessible for free, forcing management to cancel plans and unrestrict access to the taps.

Regardless, according to published reports, there was a notable drop-off of published, scheduled, group outings, picnics and excursions at end of the 1911 season, and park management was relieved when large labor unions decided to charter their Labor Day festivities, providing enough revenue to survive to close the season. 

A cinematic venture was entered in April 1913 by park manager J.E. Monroe and the Cities and Towns Film Company to use the park as a movie backdrop. Starring Maclyn Arbuckle in a variation of The Round Up, it portrays a scene using the park in which a threatening brush fire is extinguished by the fire department. Publicized as a cold weather exposure test, it resulted in a flawed print, but played in Scranton's Victoria Theater for one week and minimized royalties owed to the park under contract.

Competing parks and theaters were maintaining parity or lowering prices to Luna's rates of admission. Luna's tickets were set at a dime for adults and a nickel for children for gate admission, plus ten cents admission to each attraction. To compete with these venues, Luna management ran promotional advertisements with local vendors, such as Kolb's Pan-Daddy bread to distribute free gate tickets; tried bundling tickets, that is, offering free admission and waiving fees for certain venues; advertised out of state; and copied ideas found in other parks, such as the "Baby Incubator", all with modest success. Through these marketing efforts, they discovered dancing as a source of revenue. With the sound of orchestrated music played by the park's band, they could charge ten cents per person per dance in the Dance pavilion, and by the end of the evening with a repertoire of 30 songs, and over 300 minimum visitors, could earn significant daily revenue. The park enhanced this strategy by hiring dance instructors encouraging people to "get out on the floor" and "try dancing lessons" before regular dancing started and charging for private lessons. Dancing was very popular in this era and quickly became the principal money-maker at the park until its end. 
Accidents in the amusement industry induced changes in 1914 to enhance safety. Reportedly roller coasters in other parks had taken a yearly toll in "maimed and crippled limbs". Direction by the board of directors to enhance safety "to make doubly sure it is nigh impossible for anything to go wrong at the park" to park management came "with an immense sum spent".

Expenses to enhance safety forced management to double-down recruitment of private excursions, picnics, and outings and were met with success. Based on published reports over this season, the number of patrons noticeably increased. Dancing engagements increased as a result of weekly dance contests with dance instructors coaching students in the latest dance steps prior to contests. But management erred deciding to follow the example of major parks and open on Sunday. An outraged Reverend Anderson successfully led a boycott of the park forcing Sunday closure. Many religious groups canceled their excursions and revenue dropped significantly.

An unusual "endorsement" strategy infused great optimism as the park recorded significant numbers of patrons early in the 1915 season. Being promoted as a supposed "trip" to see an alleged friend and park manager, actor Charlie Chaplin visited the park on June 7, 1915 described by local newspapers as a "small riot" of people paying to glimpse the popular actor. 

Financial collapse of the park began on June 11, 1915, with the failure of the Blau Bank House. Blau's bank allegedly held significant cash deposits for the park which were then lost, controlled 1,393 shares of park stock that would sell below value during bank bankruptcy proceedings, and more significantly, held a promissory note using Luna Park as collateral for payment on land purchased years earlier. In an effort to regain depositor assets, bankruptcy attorneys reviewed outstanding debts owed to the bank and discovered note 334 assigned to Luna Park. Nearing the end of the season with lost funding was a difficult situation for management in meeting obligations required on the note. So unusually, they remained open as late as possible, until September 25, to generate sufficient revenue but with consequences. Several large groups booked end-of-season outings and many dance contests were held to attract patrons, but key managers resigned and an accident with injuries occurred on an overcrowded "Scenic Railway". In the final year, all expenses were cut drastically including insurance with heavy emphasis on filling the Dance pavilion as much as possible with patrons.

Disastrous end and aftermath

Disaster struck irrecoverably when one third of the park was destroyed by fire in the early morning of August 23, 1916. An uninvestigated fire of unknown origin destroyed facilities critical to the production of revenue including the Dance pavilion, Scenic Railway station, Shoot-the-Chutes amusement and railroad tracks of the Laurel Line Railroad. The eyewitness account of Scranton city patrolman John J. Horn, who discovered the fire, stated the fire's origin appeared to be the eastern side of the Dance Pavilion. Although there was speculation of an electrical origin, or one based on dumped ashes from a railroad steam locomotive, this was the approximate location used for incineration of the park's waste paper, i.e. confetti, old sheet music, etc., and the previous location of at least one serious fire. The two-story structure's ground floor also contained the park's sign and paint shop in which flammable materials were stored. The fire was "well involved" when discovered and windy conditions were prevalent. The fire jumped from one structure to the next, burned overnight until dawn, and could be seen for miles. Estimated damage was $15,000.

Even as the park continued to burn, the Board of Directors convened an emergency session nearby. As a very large outing was scheduled to occupy the park in days, and looming debt action was required, a decision was made to recreate the dance floor as quickly as possible. As the embers began to cool that morning, 150 workers were seen beginning to clear the area of debris and pour a new concrete foundation for the dance floor.

By the end of the week, a roofless dance floor was completed but emergency funds provided by individual board members were exhausted forcing decisions not to rebuild the Scenic Railway roller coaster station, the Shoot-the-Chutes ride, or substantially repair other damage. On the day of the large outing, August 26, 1916, very heavy rains fell. Attendance was limited as no one wished to pay to dance on an open platform under such conditions. Revenue was well below expectations.

Payments were due and an attempt was made to survive, but the board of directors was unable to raise sufficient funds by the deadline. On January 5, 1917, exercising a confession of judgement clause of the Blau Bank House promissory note, the park was sold at public auction to a bankruptcy attorney, Ralph W. Rymer, representing a then-anonymous individual interested in the land. In early May 1917, local newspapers announced all amusement buildings would be razed. After demolition, that individual, Peter Stipp, Sr., eventually sold the land to the city of Scranton which then quieted liens due on the promissory note through the confessed judgment clause.
 
On February 2, 1929, an attempt was made by A.H. Strohl to resurrect an amusement park on the site, but was rejected by the Scranton city council on the basis of weak financial planning and concerns of neighbors over noise.

Today
Few park remnants are identifiable today: a dam, circus platform, alligator pit, lagoon edge, an access tunnel from Laurel Line roadbed, and scattered bits of concrete. Much of the overgrown grounds were covered by 1960's construction of Interstate 81, which intersects the former area of Ingersoll's sections two and three, including the area of the Dance pavilion, and "Shoot-the-Chutes" lagoon. More land was covered or excavated by a widening of the Central Scranton Expressway in 1998. Urban development encroached the northern side (Myrtle Street) of the grounds of the former park. The mineral spring has long vanished.

Postcards and other memorabilia can occasionally be found on online auction sites and in antiques sources in northeastern Pennsylvania. The original Luna Park souvenir shop sold glass and ceramic items etched or painted with park scenes. Beginning in 1906 with Ebert & Company's black-and-white series, several postcard companies published park photo postcards. The Scranton Electric City Trolley Museum has a small public exhibit of such memorabilia.

No findings of formal, academically based, archaeological investigations of the area have been published. Several bloggers have recorded still and video imagery of walks through the area, available to access through online searches and social media.

Appendicies

Tenure of Park Managers

Murder, Mystery and Mayhem at Luna Park, Scranton 
Representative list compiled from newspaper reports of ten examples by season of unusual events that occurred in the park. (Dates are listed in the US month/day format.)

1906: Season 1

1907: Season 2

1908: Season 3

1909: Season 4

1910: Season 5

1911: Season 6

1912: Season 7

1913: Season 8

1914: Season 9

1915: Season 10

1916: Season 11

See also
Luna Park
Rocky Glen Park

External links
Electric City Trolley Museum – Electric City Trolley Museum Association home page
Knabenshue Toledo No. 2 – Page from "Airship Investigations" site
Lackawanna and Wyoming Valley RHS – LWVRR Historical Society home page
Lincoln J. Beachey – Web site dedicated to the aviation hero
Scranton Luna Park postcard imagery – NEPA's Lost Parks web site
Northern Electric Park, Luna's chief competitor – NEPA's Lost Parks web site
2007 pictures of Luna Park remnants by blogger, Frank Dutton
Lackawanna Historical Society – Refer to park documentation and imagery in the society's library

References

1906 establishments in Pennsylvania
1916 disestablishments in Pennsylvania
Defunct amusement parks in Pennsylvania
Amusement parks in Pennsylvania
Scranton, Pennsylvania